Ivanhorod ((Ivangorod)) is a village located in Uman Raion of Cherkasy Oblast (province) in central Ukraine, some  from Kyiv. It belongs to Khrystynivka urban hromada with the administration in the town of Khrystynivka, one of the hromadas of Ukraine.

History

The first traces of a settlement date back to prehistoric times, with archeological findings from the Cucuteni-Trypillian culture. In the Middle Ages Ivanhorod lay on the Chumak trade road from Kyiv to Crimea. From the 13th century on, it was part of the Grand Duchy of Lithuania and subsequently, until 1791, the Polish–Lithuanian Commonwealth. The village (from 1609 owned by the Kalinowski family) lay on the path of the Khmelnytsky Uprising. After the Second Partition of Poland Iwanogród became part of the Russian Empire.

The Jewish community in Ivanhorod dates back to early 19th century. In 1897, the Jewish population was 442 people. During the Holocaust (on what is now Ukrainian territory), a mass murder was committed by the German Einsatzgruppe in the southern part of Ivanhorod (1942) with an unknown number of victims. It is known by the Ivanhorod Einsatzgruppen photograph.

Until 18 July 2020, Ivanhorod belonged to Khrystynivka Raion. The raion was abolished in July 2020 as part of the administrative reform of Ukraine, which reduced the number of raions of Cherkasy Oblast to four. The area of Khrystynivka Raion was merged into Uman Raion.

Economy
As of 2013, Ivanhorod had 504 employed residents, with the main economic activity being agriculture. There is a school in the village, a library with 18,000 books, a medical clinic with 9 employees, pharmacy, a post office, a bank, and several large farms.

Notes and references

Holocaust locations in Ukraine
Villages in Uman Raion